The Hope Flying Dutch women's basketball program represents Hope College in women's basketball at the NCAA Division III level as a member of the Michigan Intercollegiate Athletic Association.

References

External links
 

 
Basketball teams established in 1972